The following is a list of fictional United States presidents, E through F.

E

President Emmett Earnshaw
 President in: The Plot by Irving Wallace
 Serves one term and decides not to run for re-election.

President Matthew Easton
 President in: Sunflower by Marilyn Sharpe.
 His daughter Anna is kidnapped during his term.

President Sarah Susan Eckert
 President in: Star Trek V: The Final Frontier (novelization by J.M. Dillard)
 Dillard's novelization refers to Eckert as "the first black Northam president".

President Thomas Eckhart
 President in: Agent X
Played by: John Shea

President John Henry Eden
 President in: Fallout 3
 Leader of the Enclave, the last remnant of the US government after a worldwide nuclear apocalypse, after President Dick Richardson is killed. Like Richardson, he is never actually elected, but he promises true elections and a brighter future for the wastelands of America in a radio broadcast.
 Eden is not a human being, but an AI based on the ZAX supercomputer.

President Edwards
 President in: The Lords Day by Michael Dobbs
 First woman elected to the office and third member of her family to have occupied the White House.
 Her son William-Henry Harrison Edwards, a Rhodes Scholar at Oxford University, attends the State Opening of Parliament when it is attacked by terrorists.

President Russell Eigenblick
 President in: Little, Big
 A charismatic despot and the reincarnation of Frederick Barbarossa

President Ellis
 President in: The Eleven Million Mile High Dancer by Carol Hill
 In office in the mid-1980s
 Nicknamed "Daddy Ice" due to his apathetic crisis responses and fondness for naps.
 Encounters issues including bizarre global weather, severe environmental problems, the disappearance of a Mars-bound astronaut, and ten thousand Native Americans vanishing from Cononga County, Texas, and reappearing in the Pentagon basement.

President Andrew Ellis
 President in: Tom Clancy's The Division 2
 Former Speaker of the House and third in line for the presidency
 Assumes power after the deaths of the two previous presidents during the Green Poison crisis depicted in Tom Clancy's The Division.
 Secretly associated with and propped up by a mysterious cabal that runs the Black Tusk Special Unit, a paramilitary group that invades Washington, D.C.
 After being rescued from a Hyena gang by Division agents, Ellis betrays the remnants of the pre-pandemic government by handing over a broad-spectrum antiviral to Black Tusk.

President Calvin Ellis
 President in: Earth 23
 Kryptonian from an alternate universe

President Matthew Ellis
 President in: Marvel Cinematic Universe
 Is quoted as welcoming Captain America back to the world at the Captain America exhibit at the Smithsonian Institution.
 Ellis is abducted by AIM leader Aldrich Killian (Guy Pearce) in an elaborate scheme to execute him for his collaborator, Vice President Rodriguez (Miguel Ferrer), to become the new president while Killian continues to profit through customized terrorism. Killian's plans are thwarted by Tony Stark, while Colonel James Rhodes takes Ellis to safety.
 Targeted for assassination by Hydra via Project Insight Helicarrier air strike based on Arnim Zola's algorithm that determine his future actions run counter to Hydra's agenda.
 Ellis announces and recaps the events of New York, London, Sokovia and the recent rise of the Inhumans to the world, authorizes the formation of the Advanced Threat Containment Unit, which is instructed to contain potential threats caused by people with superpowers.
 Agrees to provide support for S.H.I.E.L.D. to come out of the shadows and be reestablished, on condition that Phil Coulson steps down as director.
 Played by: William Sadler

President Walter Emerson
 President in: Deterrence
 Played by: Kevin Pollak
 After the elected vice president resigned, Emerson is confirmed with minority support of the electorate. The previous president dies of natural causes, elevating Emerson.
 Administration officials include; National Security Advisor Gayle Redford, Chief of Staff Marshall Thompson, Secretary of Defense Don Hancock, Secretary of State Deborah Cleft and Chairman of the Joint Chiefs General Frank Lancaster.
 Initially seeking his party's nomination in the next primary, having selected Senate President pro tempore Theodore Slater of Wyoming as his vice presidential nominee, he drops out after ordering a nuclear strike on Baghdad after Iraqi President Uday Hussein has the Republican Guard invade Kuwait.

President Sven Ericson
 President in the novel Full Disclosure by William Safire
 Ericson is blinded during the assassination of the USSR leader. It is revealed that the then-candidate had suffered temporary blindness during his campaign, and it was decided not to disclose this. Attempts are made to remove the president from office.

President Jackson Evans
 President in: The Contender
 A former senator who attended West Point and enjoys cigars and shark steak sandwiches. Evans is a two-term Democratic president who sought to replace his deceased vice president, Troy Ellerd, with Senator Laine Hanson (D-Ohio) to succeed him.
 Played by: Jeff Bridges
 Party: Democratic

President J. R. Ewing
 President in: Back in the USSA
 Ewing becomes President of the Confederation of Independent North American States in 1992 after the collapse of the Communist regime of the United Socialist States of America. He is still the president in 1998, although severely weakened (both politically and physically) following a 1996 assassination attempt. It is mentioned that his being president is the only thing preventing the secession of Texas. A number of military officers including Colin Powell and Nick Fury are said to scheme to overthrow him in a coup.

F

President Simon Faircliffe
 President in The President's Man by Nicholas Guild (1982 novel)
 Former U.S. Senator
 Faircliffe is secretly assassinated by the CIA director when it is discovered the latter is a traitor.

President Harold Farkley
 President in: No Way To Treat A First Lady

President Fellwick
 President in: Atomic Train
 Played by Edward Herrmann

President Julian Felsenburgh

 President in Lord of the World
 In the early 21st century, Senator Julian Felsenburgh travels across Europe, the Middle East, and the Far East to bring peace and unify the world. He manages to avert at the very last moment a seemingly inevitable devastating war between the European Confederation and the Sino-Japanese Eastern Empire. He is hailed as the Mahdi by Muslims. Felsenburgh eventually becomes President of both the US and United Europe, and his rule accepted by all countries of the world, being granted "a position hitherto undreamed of in democracy" – "a House of Government in every capital in the world,  a final veto lasting three years on every motion submitted to him, and a legal power granted to every motion he submits on three consecutive years". Felsenburgh then persecutes all religious people, particularly Catholics. In London, atheist mobs instigate large-scale pogroms of Catholics, killing them while the police – on Felsenburgh's instructions – stands aside. The same is repeated in numerous other places. Commanding a fleet of "volors" (dirigibles), Felsenburgh orders the firebombing and complete destruction of Rome to extirpate the Catholic Church. Felsenburgh is revealed to be the Antichrist, and he orders every person in the world to choose between denying the existence of God or instant death. Felsenburgh personally oversees the firebombing of Nazareth, where the last remaining Catholics have gathered to elect a new Pope, but God intervenes and brings about the end of the world.

President T.C. Fenton
 President in: The Man
 Killed along with the Speaker of the House in a building collapse in Germany.
 When invalid Vice President Noah Calvin (Lew Ayres) declines the office due to health reasons, Fenton is replaced by the President Pro Tem of the US Senate, Senator Douglass Dilman of New Hampshire.

President Charlotte Field
 President in: Long Shot
 First female President, elected to office in 2020. 
 Born and raised in Washington, D.C.
 Previously serves as United States Secretary of State under President Chambers, being the youngest person appointed to the office.
 Married to First Gentleman Fred Field (né Flarsky), a speechwriter and former journalist she began seeing romantically during her tenure with the State Department. 
 Champions the Global Rehabilitation Initiative, a radical environmentalist policy to which she was able to convince many countries to join as signatories. 
 Played by: Charlize Theron
 Political party: Democratic

President Robert Fielding
 President in: Command & Conquer
 During his time in office, he spearheads the Global Defense Initiative and the White House comes under attack from the Brotherhood of Nod.

President John Fields
 President in: Executive Power
 Played by: William Atherton

President Mallard Fillmore
 President in: Captain Carrot and his Amazing Zoo Crew.
 Fillmore's name is a play on Millard Fillmore.

President Finesterre
 President in: Thank You for Smoking by Christopher Buckley
 Assassinated around the time of the Kennedy assassination
 Uncle of Senator Finesterre, who is engaged in a sex scandal
 Grandfather of Vermont Senator Ortolan K. Finesterre, who is Senator Finesterre's nephew and the former Governor of Vermont

President Fisher
 President in: Red Dead Redemption 2.
 Fisher serves as president some time before the setting of the game.
 Only appears on the Prominent Americans Cigarette Card Set

President Gerald Fitzhugh
 President in: Left Behind, End of State by Neesa Hart, and Left Behind: World at War
 Played by: Louis Gossett Jr.
 Fitzhugh becomes a figurehead and lame duck after his powers are removed by Global Community Grand Potentate and Antichrist Nicolae Carpathia. He then secretly controls anti-Carpathia militia and revolts against the world ruler, initiating World War III. He is ultimately killed in retaliatory strikes by the G.C.

President John V. Fitz-Kenneth
 President in: "The Singular Events Which Occurred In The Hovel On The Alley Off Of Eye Street" by Avram Davidson
 Monarchial President of an alternate history United States in which magic works and is controlled by CEOs of multinational corporations.

President Maddie Fitzpatrick
 President in: The Suite Life of Zack & Cody
Fitzpatrick is president for an episode; her campaign is funded by Hot Peppers Delio.
 One of her campaign managers was Zack Martin, who becomes jealous when she kisses someone other than him.
 Played by: Ashley Tisdale

President Julia Bliss Flaherty
 President in: Seveneves
Flaherty is the last U.S. president before the destruction of Earth.
 She grabs attention in numerous talk shows and is considered by both Republicans and Democrats as a potential vice president due to her moderate, bi-partisan political views.
 Ascends to presidency after the previous president resigns ten months after election because of a scandal.
 Flaherty is faced with the task of saving some parts of humanity after the moon explodes into seven pieces and threatens to completely destroy Earth.
 She violates an international accord that demands all world leaders shall stay on earth when the apocalypse comes. Flaherty flees to the International Space Station aboard a Boeing X-37 with her science advisor Pete Starling.
 She's marginalized by the passengers of the ark at first. She attempts to reassert her former power and persuades a large number of cloud ark inhabitants to abandon the ISS.
 Disaster and internal dissent lead to the death of many members of her faction and she is overthrown in her role as leader.
 Flaherty becomes one of the seven last surviving women of humankind, the "seven eves", whose genetically modified descendants repopulate earth 5000 years later.

President Fletcher J. Fletcher
 President in: A Planet for the President
 Fletcher is president during a period of massive global climate change. During his administration, a category 5 hurricane destroys the entire city of New Orleans, killing thousands. To solve the global environmental crisis, the Fletcher administration unleashes a massive biological pandemic, saving only the United States; in the end, the virus kills all humans on the planet except Fletcher.

President Harrison Ford
 President in: Scary Movie 3
 Appears as only a portrait of actor Harrison Ford as a former US President in the White House; the current president says, "I wonder what President Ford would have done?"

President Ford
 President in: Frisky Dingo
 Ford usurps the presidency from President Taqu'il by poisoning the Speaker of the House and the President Pro Tem of the Senate, and shooting down Air Force One with a rocket launcher, while the President, Vice Cabinet, and the Cabinet are on board, making him president via succession as Secretary of Homeland Security.

President Robert Fogerty
 President in: National Lampoon Goes to the Movies
 Played by Fred Willard

President Herbert Forrest
 President in: Superman Annual #3 (vol. 2) [DC Comics 1991]
 A former senator who uses the nuclear destruction of Metropolis as an issue to win the presidency
 Forrest asks Batman to stop Superman after he causes the death of U.S. sailors while disarming a nuclear missile submarine.
 Party: Republican

President Emily Forrester
 President in: Killing Time: A Novel of the Future (2000 novel by Caleb Carr)

President James Foster
 President in: Chasing Liberty
 Foster is married to Michelle Foster and has one daughter, Anna.
 Popular second-term president with a 63% approval rating
 Played by: Mark Harmon

President William Foster
 President in: The Enemy Within (TV movie)
 Played by: Sam Waterston

President Jonathan Robert "Bob" Fowler
 President in: The Sum of All Fears
 Former governor of Ohio. During his presidency, the city of Denver (Baltimore in the film version) is destroyed by a nuclear device.
 Party: Democratic (unnamed in novel, but most likely Democrat)
 In the novel, Fowler orders a nuclear strike on Iran during the crisis, but is countermanded by CIA Deputy Director Jack Ryan and later resigns. In the sequel, Debt of Honor, he is replaced by his vice president, Roger Durling.
 Played by: James Cromwell

President Clementine Searcy Fox
 President in: First Hubby, a novel by Roy Blount, Jr.
 First female president

President-Elect MacArthur Foyle
 President-elect in: The People's Choice by Jeff Greenfield.
 Dies from a blood clot after breaking his leg in a horse riding accident before taking office.
 Party: Republican

President Frankenstein
 President in: Death Race 2000
 Former contestant in a road race that scored points on running over people
 Only three-time winner of the Continental Road Race, and only survivor of the 20th Anniversary Continental Road Race run in 2000.
 Becomes president when he runs over the dictatorial Mr. President, who had been in office since the World Crash of 1979.
 Played by David Carradine

President Benjamin Franklin
 President in: Childrens Hospital
 Mentioned in a Newsreaders segment on Children's Hospital to have been shot in the head after leaving office

President Harriet Franklin
 President in: Airline Disaster
 Franklin has to decide between family and the safety of the people in the cities below when she learns the plane her brother is piloting has been skyjacked.

President Hunter Franklin
President in: The Oval
46th President of the United States since January 20, 2025
Previously served as the 47th Governor of Pennsylvania from January 20, 2015 to January 17, 2023, and the mayor of Pittsburgh, Pennsylvania.
Graduated from Virginia Tech University
Married to Victoria Franklin and is the father of two children: Gayle and Jason Franklin.
Played by Ed Quinn

President Hugh Frankling
 President in: The Whole Truth by John Ehrlichman
 Refuses to resign after a scandal

President D. Nolan Fraser
 President in: The Venus Belt by L. Neil Smith
 As the mayor of Denver, his platform is to restore the personal liberties seen in The Probability Broach.
 Party: Propertarian

President Edgar Frazier
 President in: Seven Days in May by Fletcher Knebel and Charles W. Bailey, Jr. (1962 novel)
 Serves after President Kennedy, and is elected in 1968
 During his term the Soviet Union invades Iran, which leads to the Iranian War between the US and the Soviets, and the division of Iran between a Communist North and a Free South.
 Loses the 1972 election to Ohio Governor Jordan Lyman largely because of the outcome of the Iranian War.
 Party: Republican

President Ferris F. Fremont
 President in: Radio Free Albemuth
 Fremont is a paranoid man who turns the U.S. into a Stalinesque police state to crush a nonexistent conspiracy.

President Max Frost (Max Jacob Flatow Jr)
 President in: Wild in the Streets
 Played by: Christopher Jones
 Popular rock star who gets minimum age for President reduced to 20 and voting age to 14 by spiking Congress's water with LSD.
 Wins presidency and interns all "oldsters" in concentration camps

President Truman Theodore Fruitty
 President in: Mr. Show with Bob and David
 Played by: Jay Johnston
 The eleventy-twelfth President
 Causes a major scandal by farting

President Annemarie Fucillo
 President in Net Force: Dark Web by Jerome Preisler, based on an idea of Tom Clancy and Steve Pieczenik
 First female US President
 amidst an increasing threat by cyber warfare to the national security, Fucillo forms the Net Force, a new elite security agency to combat terror attacks from the dark web

President Fuller
 President in: Schrödinger's Cat trilogy
 One of many presidents in the series
Resigns from office after he finds the irrelevancy of his position

President Funny Valentine
President in: "Steel Ball Run" (JoJo's Bizarre Adventure)
23rd president in an alternate timeline of the United States
Seeks to gather the corpse pieces of Jesus Christ to advance the interests of the United States

President FXJKHR
 President in: Futurama
 He is the 60th President (of either Earth or the United States)
 He is an alien.
 Details of his presidency are unknown, though a monument resembling the Lincoln Memorial depicts him sitting atop a throne of skulls and eating a human.

References

Lists of fictional presidents of the United States